Soyuz MS-08 was a Soyuz spaceflight that launched on 21 March 2018. It transported three members of the Expedition 55 crew to the International Space Station. MS-08 was the 137th flight of a Soyuz spacecraft. The crew consisted of a Russian commander, and two American flight engineers.

MS-08 returned its crew to Earth on 4 October 2018.

Crew

Backup crew
Sources:

References

Crewed Soyuz missions
Spacecraft launched in 2018
2018 in Russia
Spacecraft launched by Soyuz-FG rockets
Spacecraft which reentered in 2018
Fully civilian crewed orbital spaceflights